IDLE (short for Integrated Development and Learning Environment) is an integrated development environment for Python, which has been bundled with the default implementation of the language since 1.5.2b1. It is packaged as an optional part of the Python packaging with many Linux distributions. It is completely written in Python and the Tkinter GUI toolkit (wrapper functions for Tcl/Tk).

IDLE is intended to be a simple IDE and suitable for beginners, especially in an educational environment. To that end, it is cross-platform, and avoids feature clutter.

According to the included README, its main features are:
 Multi-window text editor with syntax highlighting, autocompletion, smart indent and other.
 Python shell with syntax highlighting.
 Integrated debugger with stepping, persistent breakpoints, and call stack visibility.

Author Guido van Rossum says IDLE stands for "Integrated Development and Learning Environment", and since Van Rossum named the language Python after the British comedy group Monty Python, the name IDLE was probably also chosen partly to honor Eric Idle, one of Monty Python's founding members.

See also 

 List of integrated development environments for Python

References

External links 

 IDLE home page in the Python documentation
 IDLE page in the Python wiki
 A guide to using IDLE

Free computer libraries
Free integrated development environments
Python (programming language) software
Software using the PSF license